Alcachofa may refer to:
 The Spanish word for Artichoke
 Alcachofa (album), an album by Ricardo Villalobos